John Miles Yost (9 October 1923 – 23 June 1953) was an Australian rules footballer from Tasmania who represented the state at the 1950 Brisbane Carnival.

Yost played for Launceston in the NTFA between 1946 and 1952, making his debut on 27 April 1946 in a match versus North Launceston. He quickly established himself as a senior player, often being selected in the fullback position, a role he undertook in the state team at the 1950 Carnival and as a member of Launceston's 1951 premiership team.

Yost became ill at the age of 29 and died in June 1953.

References

1923 births
1953 deaths
Launceston Football Club players
Australian rules footballers from Tasmania